Alexander Prugh (born September 1, 1984) is an American professional golfer who has played on the Web.com Tour and the PGA Tour.

Early years
Prugh was born and raised in Spokane, Washington. He attended Joel E. Ferris High School, where he was a member of the golf team. He later went on to play at the University of Washington, where he was a three-time varsity Pac-10 All-Conference.

Professional career
Since turning professional in 2007, Prugh has spent most of his career playing on the second tier Nationwide Tour, where he has one victory, achieved at the 2009 Michael Hill New Zealand Open. In 2009, he finished 16th on the money list to earn his 2010 PGA Tour card.  In his third start of the 2010 season, Prugh started the final round of the Bob Hope Classic (rain delayed until Monday) tied for the lead and ended up finishing alone in 5th place, earning $200,000.  He followed that performance with another 5th place finish at the Farmers Insurance Open and a 10th place finish at the Northern Trust Open. Prugh's best finish on the PGA Tour is tied for second at the 2010 Frys.com Open. He finished 11th on the 2013 Web.com Tour regular season money list to earn his 2014 PGA Tour card. In 2013–14, he made only 4 cuts in 16 events and finished 206th on the FedEx Cup points list and lost his PGA Tour card. However, he finished 41st in the Web.com Tour Finals to earn his PGA Tour card for the 2014–15 season.

Amateur wins
2005 Pacific Coast Amateur, Washington State Amateur

Professional wins (1)

PGA Tour of Australasia wins (1)

1Co-sanctioned by the Nationwide Tour

Web.com Tour wins (1)

1Co-sanctioned by the PGA Tour of Australasia

Web.com Tour playoff record (0–1)

Results in major championships

CUT = missed the half-way cut
"T" = tied

See also
2009 Nationwide Tour graduates
2013 Web.com Tour Finals graduates
2014 Web.com Tour Finals graduates
2018 Web.com Tour Finals graduates

External links

Alex Prugh at GoHuskies.com

American male golfers
Washington Huskies men's golfers
PGA Tour golfers
Korn Ferry Tour graduates
Golfers from Washington (state)
Sportspeople from Spokane, Washington
1984 births
Living people